Wang Wei (born 23 October 1958) is a Chinese fencer. He competed in the team foil event at the 1984 Summer Olympics. He is now a vice-president of the International Fencing Federation. He represents the executive committee at the SEMI commission.

References

External links
 

1958 births
Living people
Chinese male fencers
Olympic fencers of China
Fencers at the 1984 Summer Olympics